Brooklyn Academy may refer to any of these institutions in Brooklyn, New York:

 Brooklyn Academy of Fine Arts
 Brooklyn Academy of Music
 Brooklyn Academy of Science and the Environment
 Brooklyn College Academy
 Brooklyn Democracy Academy